Filippo Coppola was an Italian composer, maestro di cappella of the Chapel Royal of Naples from 1658 to 1680. With Manuel García Bustamante he composed, or rearranged a Spanish composer's composition, El robo de Proserpina y sentencia de Júpiter as Las faticas de Ceres in Naples in 1678.

References

17th-century Italian composers
Italian male composers
1680 deaths
Year of birth unknown
17th-century male musicians